Frank Raymond (21 August 1903 – 6 March 1978) was an Australian rules footballer who played with Fitzroy in the Victorian Football League (VFL).

Raymond later served in the Australian Army during World War II.

Notes

External links 

1903 births
1978 deaths
Australian rules footballers from Melbourne
Fitzroy Football Club players
People from Brunswick, Victoria
Military personnel from Melbourne
Australian Army personnel of World War II